Scylax may refer to:

 Scylax of Caryanda, a Greek explorer and writer of the late 6th and early 5th centuries BCE
Çekerek River, ancient Scylax, a tributary of the Yeşil River in Turkey
 Ps.-Scylax or Pseudo-Scylax, author of the Periplus of Pseudo-Scylax
Zipaetis scylax, the dark catseye, a species of butterfly 
 Scylax, a ship's captain from Myndus, noted by Herodotus